Lasater is a surname. Notable people with the surname include:

Bob Lasater, former American football coach
Brent Lasater (born 1960), American politician
John R. Lasater (born 1931), retired U.S. Air Force Brigadier General
Judith Hanson Lasater (born 1947), American yoga teacher and writer

See also
Bryant-Lasater House
Freeborn T. Lasater House